Jennifer Wolff Conde is a Puerto Rican television reporter, show host, company executive and writer. From 1981 to 1996, Wolff appeared on multiple Puerto Rican television news shows, becoming a celebrity in the island. She has also written several published papers, including "Hacia Donde Va el Sistema Electrico? Una Mirada de Contexto" ("Where is the Electric System Headed To? A Contextual Look"), "Europa: Que Esta en Juego con la Invasion Rusa" ("Europe: What's at Stake With the Russian Invasion"-of Ukraine) and "Desde Madrid: En el Radar Para el 2022" ("From Madrid: on the Radar for 2022"). Wolff also wrote a doctoral thesis, which she named "Isla Atlántica: Puerto Rico 1580-1636. Comercio de Contrabando y la Conformación del Espacio Atlántico en el Caribe Periférico" ("Island in the Atlantic Ocean: Puerto Rico 1580-1636. Contraband trade and the conformation of the Atlantic space in the peripheral Caribbean").

As a reporter. Wolff covered news about different countries worldwide, such as Somalia, Kuwait, Cuba and Bolivia.

Early life
Wolff graduated from the University of Puerto Rico with a Ph.D in history and from Duke University in the United States as a Magna Cum Laude Double B.A. in history and Latin American studies.

Television news reporter career
Wolff was a television reporter in Puerto Rico for 14 years, beginning in late 1981 and finishing in 1996. During 1990, she started appearing on WAPA-TV's daily news show, Noticentro 4. By 1993, Wolff had moved to WAPA's main rival, WKAQ-TV, where she hosted, alongside Myraida Chaves, a show named "Estudio 2".

Personal life
Wolff resides in Madrid, Spain.

See also

List of Puerto Ricans
Pedro Rosa Nales
Guillermo Jose Torres
Luis Francisco Ojeda
Luis Antonio Cosme
Anibal Gonzalez Irizarry
Efren Arroyo
Rafael Bracero
Junior Abrams
Carmen Jovet
Keylla Hernandez
Avelino Muñoz Stevenson
"Kike" Cruz
History of women in Puerto Rico

References

Living people
Year of birth missing (living people) 
Puerto Rican television journalists
Puerto Rican women writers
University of Puerto Rico alumni
Duke University alumni
Puerto Rican people of German descent
Puerto Rican emigrants to Spain